The Laguatan (Lawata, Lawati) was a Zenata Berber clan that inhabited the Cyrenaica area during the Roman period.<ref>Wickham, Chris (2007) Framing the Early Middle Ages Oxford University Press, London, p. 333, citing Synesios, Correspondance, nn. 107-8, 125, 132 (aa. 405-12)</ref> They have been described as primarily raiders and nomadic, but others consider them a settled group who also raided.

The Laguatan emerged in the late 3rd century, when the first groups started a westward migration from their original homes in the Libyan Desert. Under the label of Austuriani (probably reflecting a then-dominant sub-tribe) they are recorded as raiding the Cyrenaica and Tripolitania in the 4th century, and in the 520s, under their leader Cabaon, they scored a major victory over the Vandals, gaining effective independence from them. In the 540s, they played a major role in the tribal wars against the Byzantines, until finally defeated by John Troglita. Procopius of Caesarea (Vandalic War II.21.2 & II.28.47) calls them the Leuathae, while Flavius Cresconius Corippus calls them Ilaguas and Laguantan. According to Corippus, they were still pagan, and worshipped Gurzil, who is identified as the son of Amun and of a cow (Iohannis II.109–110).

During the Islamic Middle Ages, Ibn Khaldun recorded that this tribal group were known as the Lawata or Louata, and was spread from the oases of Egypt's Western Desert through Cyrenaica, Tripolitania to south and central Tunisia and eastern Algeria.

References

Bibliography
 Mattingly, D. J. (1983) "The Laguatan: A Libyan Tribal Confederation in the Late Roman Empire" Libyan Studies: Annual report of the Society for Libyan Studies 14: pp. 96-108
 Yves Modéran (2003), Les Maures et l'Afrique Romaine (IVe-VIIe siècle)'', Ecole Française de Rome, 2003

Byzantine North Africa
Crete and Cyrenaica
Berber peoples and tribes
History of Cyrenaica